Dirty Story may refer to:
 Dirty Story (play), a 2003 play by John Patrick Shanley
 Dirty Story (novel), a 1967 novel by Eric Ambler

See also
 The Dirty Story: The Best of Ol' Dirty Bastard , an album by Ol' Dirty Bastard.